Danielle Henry (born 1985/1986) is a British actress and yoga teacher, known for portraying the role of Mandy Marquez in the BBC soap opera Doctors. She has also appeared as Latisha Daggert in the ITV soap opera Emmerdale, as well as Mary Oliver in the CBBC series My Mum Tracy Beaker.

Career
Henry made her debut acting appearance in the ITV soap opera Emmerdale; she appeared as Latisha Daggert from 2001 to 2002, later making a brief return in 2006. She then made appearances in series such as Torchwood and Survivors, and in 2011, she starred in the BBC series Candy Cabs. In 2012, Henry was cast in the BBC soap opera Doctors as series regular Mandy Marquez. In the soap, she played the girlfriend of Freya Wilson, who is portrayed by Lu Corfield, her former Candy Cabs co-star. The pair were nominated for Best On-Screen Partnership at the 2014 British Soap Awards. In 2021, starred in the CBBC series My Mum Tracy Beaker as Mary Oliver.

Filmography

References

External links
 

1980s births
21st-century British actresses
Black British actresses
British film actresses
British soap opera actresses
British television actresses
Living people
Place of birth missing (living people)